Guanzhou Island, formerly known in English as Dove Island, is an island in Haizhu District, Guangzhou, Guangdong Province, China. It is also branded as Guangzhou International Biotech Island since July 2011, forming the centre of Guangzhou's biotech basis.

Geography and Administration 
Guangzhou International Biotech Island covers a total area of 1.8 square kilometers. Part of Huangpu District, it is located right between Huangpu and Haizhu District.

Guangzhou International Biotech Island

In 1999, Guangzhou Municipal Government announced plans to develop Guanzhou Island into Guangzhou International Biotech Island, in order to meet the need of biological technology development. In 2000, Guanzhou Island was approved to establish an international biotechnology research and production base, and was officially named "Guangzhou International Biotech Island". Construction began in 2008. It was officially put into operation in July 2011. It is now under the jurisdiction of the Guangzhou Economic and Technological Development Zone, but the entire island is under the jurisdiction of Guangzhou Economic and Technological Development Zone. The administrative division still belongs to Haizhu District.

A website about the "bio-island" says the aim is to put "emphasis on introducing domestic and overseas high-end biotechnology enterprise headquarters and R&D center, biotechnology research and development institutions, biological service enterprises and organizations".

In April 2021, a joint venture of Geneseeq Technology and AstraZeneca announced plans to build a clinical diagnostics laboratory on the island.

Transport
The island is served by Guanzhou station on Line 4 on the Guangzhou Metro.

References 

Haizhu District
Islands of Guangzhou